Brando Matthew Eaton (born July 17, 1986) is an American film and television actor. He is best known for his roles in Dexter, The Secret Life of the American Teenager, and Zoey 101.

Life and career 
Brando Matthew Eaton was born on July 17, 1986, in Los Angeles, California, where he was raised as an only child by his single mother. He started doing plays at the age of five and continued until his later high school years. Upon graduating at the age of 17, he decided to finally start pursuing his passion as a career. Brando left home at 18 to start his journey into adulthood, working day jobs to keep up with the costs of living and acting classes.

Having established a solid résumé, Brando has achieved his first major goal of making a living doing what he loves most.
He appeared in such films as Balls Out: Gary the Tennis Coach; Alvin and the Chipmunks: The Squeakquel, and The Powder Puff Principle. He played Vince Blake in Zoey 101 and appeared in The Secret Life of the American Teenager as Griffin. He has made numerous appearances on television.

In 2016, Eaton endorsed and campaigned for presidential candidate Gary Johnson. He also directed the documentary I Am Gary Johnson.

Selected filmography
 2006, 2008: Zoey 101 as Vince Blake (4 episodes)
 2007: Notes from the Underbelly as Graham (1 episode)
 2007: Bionic Woman as Ethan (2 episodes)
 2007: CSI: Crime Scene Investigation as Rodney Banks (1 episode)
 2007: The Closer as Justin Darcy (1 episode)
 2007: Journeyman as Young Dan Vasser (1 episode)
 2008: The Bill Engvall Show as Scott Simmons (2 episodes)
 2008: The Mentalist as Danny Kurtik (1 episode)
 2008: The Unit as Josh (1 episode)
 2008: Do Not Disturb as Jason (1 episode)
 2009: Alvin and the Chipmunks: The Squeakquel as Jeremy Smith
 2009: NCIS as Patrick Ellis (1 episode)
 2009–2011: Dexter as Jonah Mitchell (8 episodes)
 2009–2012: The Secret Life of the American Teenager as Griffin  (22 episodes)
 2009: Mental as Gabe (4 episodes)
 2009: Bones as Rory Davis (1 episode)
 2009: Nip/Tuck as Ricky Wells (1 episode)
 2011: American Horror Story as Kyle Greenwell (2 episodes)
 2011: Born to Race  as Jake Kendall
 2012: TalhotBlond as Brian
 2012: Burn Notice as Evan (1 episode)
 2012: Made in Jersey as Doug Hartsock (episode 4 "Payday")
 2013: NCIS: Los Angeles as Mitchell ("The Livelong Day"[117] season 5 episode 7)
 2013: Hawaii Five-0 as Jacobson (season 4 episode 2)
 2014: Cabin Fever: Patient Zero as Josh
 2014-2016: Awkward: as Adam (8 episodes, season 4 & 5)
 2014: Melissa & Joey as Emerson Pritchard (season 3 episode 23)
 2015: American Sniper as Dapper Navy Man
 2016: Killer Assistant as David
 2019: Bennett's War as Kurt Walker
 2020: Psycho Sister-In Law as Nick Downes
 2021: Monster Hunter: Legends of the Guild as Julius

References

External links
 
 Official Brando Eaton Website

1986 births
American male film actors
American male television actors
Living people
Male actors from Los Angeles
21st-century American male actors
People from Bellmore, New York